Events from the year 1947 in Denmark.

Incumbents
 Monarch – Christian X (until 20 April), Frederick IX
 Prime minister – Knud Kristensen (until 13 November), Hans Hedtoft

Events
 20 April – King Christian X dies, and is succeeded on the throne by his elder son, King Frederick IX.
 13 November – Prime Minister Knud Kristensen resigns following a motion of no confidence, and is replaced by Hans Hedtoft.

Sports

Football
 Ab wins 1946–47 Danish 1st Division. It is their sixth Danish football championship.

Swimming
 1014 September  Denmark wins five gold medals and one bronze medal at the 1947 European Aquatics Championships.

Other
 29 June The Round Zealand sailing race takes place for the first time.

Births
 29 April – Jacob Holdt, photographer

Deaths
 10 January – August Blom, film director, production leader and pioneer of silent films (born 1869)
 15 January – Georg Carl Amdrup, admiral, polar explorer (born 1866)
 20 April – Christian X, King of Denmark (born 1870)
 29 April – Ove Paulsen, botanist, professor at the Pharmaceutical College in Copenhagen 1920–1947 (born 1874)
 4 May  Cathrine Horsbøl, firmotiremaker (born 1872)
 25 June – Oluf Olsson, gymnast, silver medallist at the 1906 Intercalated Games, bronze medallist at the 1912 Summer Olympics (born 1873)

References

 
Denmark
Years of the 20th century in Denmark
1940s in Denmark
1947 in Europe